Stone is the debut album from Finnish thrash metal band Stone, released in 1988. It was remastered and reissued in 2003, and again in 2009, bundled with No Anaesthesia! in a 2-CD set. Several singles were released from the album, which was released by Mechanic Records for US distribution, while Megamania released it in the band's native country.

Track listing 

Notes
 On the 2003 re-release, "The Final Cuntdown" is re-titled "The Final Countdown" (the correct title of the song). It is a parody cover of the Europe song "The Final Countdown".
 "No Commands" was covered by Children of Bodom. It can be found on their 2009 covers album Skeletons in the Closet and as a bonus track on some versions of their 1998 album Hatebreeder.

Singles 
Three singles were released in support of the album:
 "Real Delusion"/"Day of Death" (1987)
 "Back to the Stone Age"/"Symptom of the Universe" (The latter song being a Black Sabbath cover later made available as a bonus track on the Stoneage 2.0 compilation CD) (1988)
 "Get Stoned"/"No Commands" (as a promo single) (1988)

Personnel 
 Janne Joutsenniemi – bass, vocals
 Jiri Jalkanen – guitar
 Roope Latvala – guitar
 Pekka Kasari – drums

Production
 Mikko Karmila – production

References 

1988 debut albums
Stone (band) albums